Hiroshi Ono can refer to:

 Hiroshi Ono (photographer) (born 1971), Japanese photographer
 Hiroshi Ono (scholar) (born 1934), Japanese scholar
 Hiroshi Ono (weightlifter) (born 1950), Japanese Olympic weightlifter
 Hiroshi Ono (artist) (1957–2021), Japanese video game artist